"Giant of Castelnau" refers to three bone fragments (a humerus, tibia, and femoral mid-shaft) discovered by Georges Vacher de Lapouge in 1890 in the sediment used to cover a Bronze Age burial tumulus, and dating possibly back to the Neolithic. According to de Lapouge, the fossil bones may belong to one of the largest humans known to have existed.

Discovery 

The bones were discovered by the Georges Vacher de Lapouge in the Bronze Age cemetery of Castelnau-le-Lez, France during the winter of 1890. His findings were published in the journal La Nature, Vol. 18, 1890 Issue 888. The height of the giant was estimated at  according to de Lapouge, and the bones were dated to the Neolithic period, since they were found at the very bottom of the Bronze Age burial tumulus. The journal includes a photo engraving of what was identified as the humerus, tibia, and femoral mid-shaft of the giant compared to a normal size humerus in the center.

Writing in the journal La Nature, de Lapouge describes the bones in detail: "I think it unnecessary to note that these bones are undeniably human, despite their enormous size.... The first is the middle part of the shaft of a femur, 14 cm length, almost cylindrical in shape, and the circumference of the bone is 16 cm.... The second piece is the middle and upper part of the shaft of a tibia.... The circumference is 13 cm at the nutrient foramen.... the length of fragment is 26 cm.... The third, very singular, was regarded by good anatomists as the lower part of a humerus.... The volumes of the bones were more than double the normal pieces to which they correspond. Judging by the usual intervals of anatomical points, they also involve lengths almost double.... The subject would have been a likely size of 3m, 50."

The bones of the giant were studied at the University of Montpellier and examined by M. Sabatier, professor of zoology at the University of Montpellier, and M. Delage, professor of paleontology at the University of Montpellier, in addition to other anatomists. In 1892 the bones were studied carefully by Dr. Paul Louis André Kiener, professor of pathological anatomy at Montpellier School of Medicine, for which he admitted they represented a "very tall race", but nevertheless found them abnormal in dimensions and apparently of "morbid growth".

It is of some interest that in 1894, press accounts mentioned a further discovery of bones of human giants unearthed at a prehistoric cemetery at Montpellier, France (5 km southwest of Castelnau), while workers were excavating a water works reservoir. Skulls "28, 31, and 32 inches in circumference" were reported alongside other bones of gigantic proportions which indicated they belonged to a race of men "between 10 and 15 feet in height." The bones were reportedly sent to the French Academy of Sciences for further study.

See also
 Teutobochus
 Meganthropus
 Patagon
 List of tallest people

References

Bronze Age France
Hominin fossils
Human height
Quaternary fossil record